Sergio Carlos Strandberg (born 14 April 1996) is a Swedish professional footballer who plays as a striker for Al-Sailiya.

Career

Born to a Swedish father and a mother who is Portuguese with Mozambican heritage, Strandberg grew up in Backa, Gothenburg, where he joined the local lower league side Backa IF as a six-year-old. In 2005 the club merged with Hisingstads IS to form Hisingsbacka FC which is where Strandberg stayed and eventually got to make his first team debut in the seventh tier of Swedish football at age 15.

In 2012, he signed a youth contract with Gothenburg based Allsvenskan club BK Häcken. There he became the top goalscorer of the U17 league and was moved up to the U19 team at the end of the year. In 2013, he continued scoring goals for the U19 and U21 teams which in the summer resulted in Häcken signing him to a 4.5-year professional contract.

CSKA Moscow
In the summer of 2014, he was subject for a move to German side Borussia Dortmund but the player failed the medical, so the transfer did not materialize. However, in the following transfer window, he joined Russian Premier League side CSKA Moscow on a 5-year contract, the 2nd of February 2015.

On 21 August 2015, Strandberg joined Ural on loan till the end of 2015.

On 31 March 2016, Strandberg moved to AIK Fotboll on a loan deal until mid-July. After scoring seven goals in ten games Strandberg caught negative attention by grabbing team mate Daniel Sundgren by the throat after a 3–2 win against Falkenberg causing a two-game suspension.

Club Brugge
On 5 January 2017, he moved to Belgium to Club Brugge KV, signing a contract that would run until 2021. Twelve days later, he was sent on loan to Westerlo until the end of the 2016–17 season.

Malmö FF
On 9 August 2017, Club Brugge agreed a fee in the excess of €1 million with Swedish champions Malmö FF for Strandberg who was set for a medical the same day ahead of a permanent move with a contract until 2021. Later that afternoon Strandberg was unveiled as a Malmö FF player. Strandberg scored a goal in the game against IFK Norrköping that won Malmö FF the 2017 Allsvenskan title.

Al-Hazem
On 30 August 2019, Al-Hazem signed Strandberg for one season from Malmö FF.

Abha
On 18 October 2020, Abha signed Strandberg for one season from Al-Hazem.

International career
In September 2013 Strandberg was selected to the Sweden national under-17 football team that would compete in the 2013 FIFA U-17 World Cup. As his mother is Portuguese with Mozambican roots, he could potentially represent one of those countries at international level, should he be selected.

Career statistics

Club

Honours
Malmö FF
Allsvenskan: 2017

Al-Sailiya SC
Qatari Stars Cup: 2021–22

Sweden U17
FIFA U-17 World Cup Third place: 2013

Individual
Sweden U21 joint-top scorer: 13 goals (shared with Ola Toivonen)

References

External links
  (archive)
 
 

1996 births
Living people
Swedish people of Mozambican descent
Swedish people of Portuguese descent
Association football forwards
Hisingsbacka FC players
BK Häcken players
Allsvenskan players
Swedish footballers
Sweden under-21 international footballers
Sweden youth international footballers
PFC CSKA Moscow players
Swedish expatriate footballers
Swedish expatriate sportspeople in Russia
Expatriate footballers in Russia
Russian Premier League players
FC Ural Yekaterinburg players
AIK Fotboll players
K.V.C. Westerlo players
Swedish expatriate sportspeople in Belgium
Expatriate footballers in Belgium
Swedish expatriate sportspeople in Saudi Arabia
Expatriate footballers in Saudi Arabia
Belgian Pro League players
Malmö FF players
Al-Hazem F.C. players
Abha Club players
Saudi Professional League players
Örebro SK players
Footballers from Gothenburg